Nolan Sental Smith (born January 18, 2001) is an American football outside linebacker for the Georgia Bulldogs. He was a two-time CFP national champion with the Bulldogs, winning back to back in 2021 and 2022.

High school career 
Smith played for IMG Academy in high school but also attended Calvary Day School in Savannah, Georgia. Over the course of two years Smith played in 15 games totaling 88 tackles, 10.5 sacks, an interception, and he forced fumble. Nolan was rated as the number one player in the country and 20th best all-time by 247Sports.com and his comparison was Pro Bowl pass rusher Khalil Mack. As a senior he was named to the USA Today All-USA high school football team and a first-team All-American by MaxPreps. Smith signed to play college football for the University of Georgia.

College career 

Smith saw 11 games in his freshman season. In these games Smith recorded 18 tackles and 2.5 sacks. In the home opener against Murray State, Smith had 1.5 sacks and 3 tackles.

Smith played in all 10 regular season games. In these games Nolan's stat line was 22 tackles and 2.5 sacks. Smith started his first game against Tennessee. In this game he would only have one tackle. In the season opener vs Arkansas, Smith would tally 6 tackles and 1.5 sacks.

Smith played in 11 games. In the SEC opener against South Carolina, Smith would record a career high 8 tackles and he would also force a fumble. In the game vs Vanderbilt, Smith was named a team captain. Against rival Florida, Smith forced a fumble and got his first interception of his career in just a 39-second span. Against Missouri, Smith blocked a punt that resulted in a safety. Smith's final stats were 40 tackles, 1.5 sacks, 2 forced fumbles, and one interception. Smith announced that he would return to Georgia for his senior season in 2022 rather than enter the 2022 NFL Draft.

On October 29, 2022, Smith exited the game against Florida, tearing a pectoral muscle and prematurely ending his season.  Smith finished the season with seven tackles, three sacks, and 16 quarterback hurries.

Professional career 
Smith ran a 4.39-second 40-yard dash at the 2023 NFL Combine, making him the second-fastest defensive lineman since 2003 after Amaré Barno (2022).

References

External links 
 Georgia Bulldogs bio

Georgia Bulldogs football players
American football outside linebackers
Living people
2001 births
IMG Academy alumni
Players of American football from Savannah, Georgia